Willard Dryden Paddock (October 23, 1873 – November 25, 1956), was an American painter and sculptor. Born in Brooklyn, New York, he studied at the Pratt Institute in Brooklyn under the tutelage of sculptor Herbert Adams, before traveling to Paris to study at the  Académie Colarossi under the painters Gustave-Claude-Etienne Courtois and Louis Auguste Girardot. Paddock is perhaps better known for his sculptural work, which garnered national attention, and included memorial structures, fountains, busts, figures, and sundials.

Selected works

Sundial, Boy With Spider, bronze sundial, 1916–1918; Owner: Indianapolis Museum of Art

Certain other sculptures by Paddock were surveyed and documented by the "Save Outdoor Sculpture!" project.

References

External links 

 Willard Dryden Paddock Photographs and Papers. Yale Collection of American Literature, Beinecke Rare Book and Manuscript Library.

1873 births
1956 deaths
19th-century American painters
19th-century American male artists
American male painters
20th-century American painters
20th-century American sculptors
19th-century American sculptors
American male sculptors
Académie Colarossi alumni
20th-century American male artists
Pratt Institute alumni
American expatriates in France